Haplogroup Q-M346 is a subclade of Y-DNA Haplogroup Q. Haplogroup Q-M346 is defined by the presence of the M346 Single Nucleotide Polymorphism (SNP).

Origin and distribution 
Q-M346 was discovered in Central Asia and announced in Sengupta 2006. A latter paper suggested that its ancestral state was isolated to India, but this has since been refuted by its presence in West Asia, Europe and the Americas.

Asia
Q-M346 has a wide distribution across much of Asia.

The Americas 
In the Americas, the founding paternal lineages include those who are Q-M346 but do not belong to the Q-M3 lineage.

Associated SNPs 
Q-M346 is marked by the presence of the M346 SNP. Since the discovery of M346 several additional SNPs have been found to also be associated with Q-M346. These SNP's include: L56 and L57. These SNPs appear to be "parallel" to M346.

Subgroups 
This is Thomas Krahn at the Genomic Research Center's Draft tree Proposed Tree for haplogroup Q-M346. The first three levels of subclades are shown. Additional detail is provided on the linked branch article pages.

 Q-MEH2 MEH2, L472, L528
 Q-M346 M346, L56, L57, L474, L892, L942
 Q-M323 M323
 Q-L717 L717, L718
 Q-L940 L940
 Q-L527 L527, L529, L639
 Q-L933 L933, L938, L941
 Q-L53 L53, L55, L213, L331, L475, L476
 Q-L54 L54

See also
Human Y-chromosome DNA haplogroup

Y-DNA Q-M242 subclades

Y-DNA backbone tree

References

External links 
The Y-DNA Haplogroup Q Project

Q-M346